Bomarea edulis, common name salsilla, is a species of flowering plant in the alstroemeria family Alstroemeriaceae, that is native to the tropics of Mexico and the United States.

The Latin specific epithet edulis refers to the edible tubers, which are sometimes used as a substitute for potatoes.

B. edulis is grown as an ornamental plant. In 2012 it was awarded the Royal Horticultural Society’s Award of Garden Merit.

References

Gallery

edulis